Vulcan's Forge is an adventure novel by Jack Du Brul.  This is the 1st book featuring the author’s primary protagonist, Philip Mercer.

Plot introduction
During the Cold War, the Soviet Union launched a secret operation against the United States, detonating a nuclear bomb on the ocean floor and creating a volcano that would take decades to rise to the surface.

Now, two hundred miles off Hawaii, an island is forming-an island that holds unimaginable wealthe and power for those who control it.  As the fight to claim the island rages from the halls of power to the depths of the ocean, Philip Mercer must wage a battle against both man and nature to bring the world back from the edge of destruction.

References

1998 American novels
Novels by Jack Du Brul
Novels set in Hawaii
Forge Books books